= La Sera (newspaper) =

Newspaper in Milan, 1892–1927

- L'indirizzo sarà di democrazia operosa e ordinata
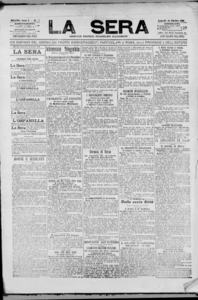
- Format: Evening broadsheet
- Founded: 1892
- Ceased publication: 1927
- Language: Italian
- City: Milan
- Country: Italy

La sera: giornale politico, finanziario, illustrato was a daily evening newspaper in Milan, Italy, from 1892 to 1927. In 1927, it merged with Il Secolo to become La Sera-Il Secolo, which closed in 1945.

Its editor from 1917 to 1924 was Gian Luca Zanetti, who gave it its motto "L'indirizzo sarà di democrazia operosa e ordinata" 'Our guiding principle will be an active and orderly democracy'. La Sera opposed fascism and Mussolini, which led to Zanetti's forced resignation and the sale of the newspaper in 1924. Edgardo Longoni replaced Zanetti in February 1924.

In 1892, it was advertised as the "least expensive newspaper in Milan"; subscriptions included the weekly L'Illustrazione popolare.
